Slim Whitman Sings is a studio album by Slim Whitman, released in 1962 on Imperial Records.

In the UK, the album was titled Slim Whitman Sings—Vol. 4, as there have been several albums bearing the title Slim Whitman Sings before.

Release history 
The album was issued in the United States by Imperial Records as a 12-inch long-playing record, catalog numbers LP-9194 (mono) and LP-12194 (stereo).

In October 1962, it was issued under the title Slim Whitman Sings—Vol. 4 in the UK by London Records, catalog number HA-P 8013.

There is also a U.S. reissue under the title Anytime.

Track listing

References 

1962 albums
Slim Whitman albums
Imperial Records albums